The Pobjoy P was a British seven-cylinder, air-cooled, aircraft engine designed by Douglas Rudolf Pobjoy and built by Pobjoy Airmotors. It became the progenitor of the Pobjoy R/Niagara/Cataract family of small radial engines. A notable feature of the Pobjoy P was the propeller reduction gear which allowed the small engine to operate at more desirable higher speeds.

Applications
 Comper C.L.A.7 Swift
 Parnall Imp

Specifications (Pobjoy P)

References

P
1920s aircraft piston engines
Aircraft air-cooled radial piston engines